Sweeting Cay is a town in the Bahamas, located on Grand Bahama island. It has a population of 516 (2012 estimates). Sweeting Cay is a small fishing village that is the easternmost on the island.

It is 180 km north of the capital Nassau. Sweeting Cay is 3 meters above sea level. It is north of East Grand Bahama National Park.

References

External links
Sweetings Cay

Populated places in the Bahamas
Grand Bahama